Andrea Riccardi (born 16 January 1950, in Rome) is an Italian historian, professor, politician and activist, founder of the Community of Sant'Egidio. He served as minister for international cooperation without portfolio in the Monti Cabinet.

Life
In 1999, he received the Houphouet-Boigny Peace Prize from the United Nations Educational, Scientific, and Cultural Organization. In November 2004, he was given the International Balzan Prize for Humanity, Peace and Brotherhood among Peoples. He has also taught at Sapienza University and the University of Bari.

Andrea Riccardi is also a member of the Fondation Chirac's honour committee, ever since the foundation was launched in 2008 by former French president Jacques Chirac in order to promote world peace. He also participated as jury member in 2009 for the Prize for Conflict Prevention awarded every year by this foundation. From 4 January 2013 to 16 May 2013 Riccardi was the president of Civic Choice, a centrist political party.

Books 
 Sant'Egidio, Rome and the World - by Andrea Riccardi, Peter Heinegg,  / 9780854395590, Saint Paul Publications
 French Catholicism
 Homme et femme, le rêve de Dieu
 Il secolo del martirio. I cristiani nel Novecento (The Century of Martyrdom. Christians in the 20th Century), 2000
 Ils sont morts pour leur foi (They died for their faith), 2002

References 

 Profile of Andrea Riccardi Time

External links 
 

|-

1950 births
Living people
Writers from Rome
Civic Choice politicians
Sapienza University of Rome alumni
21st-century Italian politicians
Government ministers of Italy
Catholic lay organisations
Italian Christian pacifists
Italian Roman Catholic missionaries
Commanders Crosses of the Order of Merit of the Federal Republic of Germany
Politicians from Rome